is a former member of the Japanese idol girl group SKE48. She was a member of SKE48's Team S.

Career 
Miyamae passed SKE48's 5th generation auditions in October 2011. Her debut was on November 26, 2011. On April 13, 2013, she was promoted to Team E during SKE48's shuffle. She started activities as a Team E member in July 2013.

In February 2014, during the AKB48 Group Shuffle, it was announced she would be transferred to Team S. She first entered SKE48's Senbatsu for the single 12 Gatsu no Kangaroo. In this single, Miyamae and Ryoha Kitagawa were appointed the centers. This is the first time Jurina Matsui is not the center.

On September 28, 2016, her graduation concert was held at SKE48 theater. Her last activity date as SKE48 was set for September 30.

Discography

SKE48 singles

AKB48 singles

Appearances

Stage units
SKE48 Kenkyuusei Stage 
 ""
SKE48 Kenkyuusei Stage 
 ""
 ""
 ""
SKE48 Team E 3rd Stage 
 
SKE48 Team S 3rd Stage  (Revival)

External links
 
 Official Blog
 Ami Miyamae on Google+

References

1997 births
Living people
Japanese idols
Japanese women pop singers
Musicians from Aichi Prefecture
SKE48 members